(also ), also known in its later evolved form as Siddhamātṛkā, is a medieval Brahmic abugida, derived from the  Gupta script and ancestral to the Nāgarī, Assamese, Bengali, Tirhuta, Odia and Nepalese scripts.

The word  means "accomplished" or "perfected" in Sanskrit. Other names for the script include bonji lit. "Brahma's characters" and "Sanskrit script" and  lit. "Siddhaṃ script".

History

The  script evolved from the Gupta Brahmi script in the late 6th century CE.

Many Buddhist texts taken to China along the Silk Road were written using a version of the  script. This continued to evolve, and minor variations are seen across time, and in different regions. Importantly it was used for transmitting the Buddhist tantra texts. At the time it was considered important to preserve the pronunciation of mantras, and Chinese was not suitable for writing the sounds of Sanskrit. This led to the retention of the  script in East Asia. The practice of writing using  survived in East Asia where Tantric Buddhism persisted.

Kūkai introduced the  script to Japan when he returned from China in 806, where he studied Sanskrit with Nalanda-trained monks including one known as Prajñā (734–). By the time Kūkai learned this script, the trading and pilgrimage routes over land to India had been closed by the expanding Abbasid Caliphate.

In the middle of the 9th century, China experienced a series of purges of "foreign religions", thus cutting Japan off from the sources of  texts. In time, other scripts, particularly Devanagari, replaced  in India, while 's northeastern derivative called Gaudi evolved to become the Assamese, Bengali, Tirhuta, Odia and also the Nepalese scripts in the eastern and northeastern regions of South Asia, leaving East Asia as the only region where  is still used.

There were special forms of Siddhaṃ used in Korea that varied significantly from those used in China and Japan, and there is evidence that Siddhaṃ was written in Central Asia, as well, by the early 7th century.

As was done with Chinese characters, Japanese Buddhist scholars sometimes created multiple characters with the same phonological value to add meaning to Siddhaṃ characters. This practice, in effect, represents a 'blend' of the Chinese style of writing and the Indian style of writing and allows Sanskrit texts in Siddhaṃ to be differentially interpreted as they are read, as was done with Chinese characters that the Japanese had adopted. This led to multiple variants of the same characters.

Characteristics
 is an abugida rather than an alphabet, as each character indicates a syllable, including a consonant and (possibly) a vowel. If the vowel sound is not explicitly indicated, the short 'a' is assumed. Diacritic marks are used to indicate other vowels, as well as the anusvara and visarga. A virama can be used to indicate that the consonant letter stands alone with no vowel, which sometimes happens at the end of Sanskrit words.

Siddhaṃ texts were usually written from left to right then top to bottom, as with other Brahmic scripts, but occasionally they were written in the traditional Chinese style, from top to bottom then right to left. Bilingual Siddhaṃ-Japanese texts show the manuscript turned 90 degrees clockwise and the Japanese is written from top to bottom, as is typical of Japanese, and then the manuscript is turned back again, and the Siddhaṃ writing is continued from left to right (the resulting Japanese characters appear sideways).

Over time, additional markings were developed, including punctuation marks, head marks, repetition marks, end marks, special ligatures to combine conjuncts and rarely to combine syllables, and several ornaments of the scribe's choice, which are not currently encoded. The nuqta is also used in some modern Siddhaṃ texts.

Vowels
 {| class="wikitable" style="text-align:center;"
|- style="font-size:80%;"
!Independent form!!Romanized!!As diacritic with !!Independent form!!Romanized!!As diacritic with 
|-
|  |||| 
|  |||| 
|-
|  |||| 
|  |||| 
|-
|  |||| 
|  |||| 
|-
|  |||| 
|  |||| 
|-
|  |||| 
|  |||| 
|-
|  |||| 
|  |||| 
|}
{| class="wikitable" style="text-align:center;"
|+Alternative forms
|-
|  
|  
|  
|  
|  
|  
|  
|  
|  
|  
|}

 {| class="wikitable" style="text-align:center;"
|- style="font-size:80%"
!Independent form!!Romanized!!As diacritic with !!Independent form!!Romanized!!As diacritic with 
|-
|  |||| 
|  ||||style="background:#dddddd;"|
|-
|  ||||style="background:#dddddd;"|
|  ||||style="background:#dddddd;"|
|}

Consonants
{| class="wikitable" style="text-align:center;"
|-
!rowspan="2"|
!colspan="5"|Stop
!rowspan="2"|Approximant
!rowspan="2"|Fricative
|-
! style="font-size:80%"|Tenuis
! style="font-size:80%"|Aspirated
! style="font-size:80%"|Voiced
! style="font-size:80%"|Breathy voiced
! style="font-size:80%"|Nasal
|-
!Glottal
|colspan="6" style="background:#dddddd;"|
|   
|-
!Velar
|   
|   
|   
|   
|   
|colspan="2" style="background:#dddddd;"|
|-
!Palatal
|   
|   
|   
|   
|   
|   
|   
|-
!Retroflex
|   
|   
|   
|   
|   
|   
|   
|-
!Dental
|   
|   
|   
|   
|   
|   
|   
|-
!Bilabial
|   
|   
|   
|   
|   	
|colspan="2" style="background:#dddddd;"|
|-
!Labiodental
| colspan="5" style="background:#dddddd;"|
|   
|colspan="1" style="background:#dddddd;"|
|}

{| class="wikitable" style="text-align:center;"
|+Conjuncts in alphabet
|-
|   
| style="background:#dddddd;"|  
|}

{| class="wikitable" style="text-align:center;"
|+Alternative forms
|-
|  
|  
|  
|  
|  
|  
|  
|  
|  
|  
|  
|  
|  
|  
|  
|  
|  
|}

Conjuncts

 {| class="wikitable" style="text-align:center;"
|-
! kkṣ !! -ya !! -ra !! -la !! -va !! -ma !! -na
|-
|   
|   
|   
|   
|   
|   
|   
|-
|   
|   
|   
|   
|   
|   
|   
|-
|   
| colspan="6"| 
|-
| colspan="7"|    total 68 rows.
|}
↑ The combinations that contain adjoining duplicate letters should be deleted in this table.
{| class="wikitable" style="text-align:center;"
|-
|   
|   
|   
|   
|-
|   
|   
|   
|   
|-
|   
|   
|   
|   
|-
|   
|   
|   
|   
|-
|   
|   
|   
|   
|}

{| class="wikitable" style="text-align:center;"
|-
|   
|   
|   
|   
| style="background:#dddddd;"|
|-
|   
|   
|   
|   
|   
|}

{| class="wikitable"
|-
|   
|   
|   
|   
|   
|-
|   /
|   /
|   /
|   /
|   
|-
|   
|   
|   
|   
|   
|-
|   
|   
|   /
|   /
|   
|-
|   
|   
|   
|   
|   
|}

{| class="wikitable"
|-
|   
|   
|   
|   
|-
|   
|   
|   
|   
|}

{| class="wikitable"
|-
|   
|   
|   
|   
|}

{| class="wikitable" style="text-align:center;"
|-
|  
|  
|  
|  
|  
|  
|  
|  
| 
|}

 Alternative forms of conjuncts that contain .
{| class="wikitable"
|   
|   
|    
|   
|}

ṛ syllables
{| class="wikitable" style="text-align:center;"
|-
|  
|  
|  
|  
|  
|  
|  
|  
|  
|  
| 
|}

Some sample syllables
 {| class="wikitable" style="text-align:center;"
|-
|  
|  
|  
|  
|  
|  
|  
|  
|  
|  
|  
|  
|-
|  
|  
|  
|  
|  
|  
|  
|  
|  
|  
|  
|  
|}

Usage

In Japan, the writing of mantras and copying/reading of sutras using the  script is still practiced in the esoteric schools of Shingon Buddhism and Tendai as well as in the syncretic sect of Shugendō. A recent innovation is the writing of Japanese language slogans on T-shirts using Bonji. Japanese  has evolved from the original script used to write sūtras and is now somewhat different from the ancient script.

It is typical to see  written with a brush, as with Chinese writing; it is also written with a bamboo pen.

Siddhaṃ fonts
 is still largely a hand written script. Some efforts have been made to create computer fonts, though to date none of these are capable of reproducing all of the  conjunct consonants. Notably, the Chinese Buddhist Electronic Texts Association has created a  font for their electronic version of the Taisho , though this does not contain all possible conjuncts. The software Mojikyo also contains fonts for Siddhaṃ, but split Siddhaṃ in different blocks and requires multiple fonts to render a single document.

A  input system which relies on the CBETA font Siddhamkey 3.0 has been produced.

Unicode

Siddhaṃ script was added to the Unicode Standard in June 2014 with the release of version 7.0.

The Unicode block for Siddhaṃ is U+11580–U+115FF:

Notes

References

Citations

Sources 

 Bonji Taikan (梵字大鑑). (Tōkyō: Meicho Fukyūkai, 1983)
 Chaudhuri, Saroj Kumar (1998). Siddham in China and Japan, Sino-Platonic papers No. 88
 
 Stevens, John. Sacred Calligraphy of the East. (Boston, MA: Shambala, 1995.)
 Van Gulik, R.H. Siddham: An Essay on the History of Sanskrit Studies in China and Japan (New Delhi, Jayyed Press, 1981).
 Yamasaki, Taikō. Shingon: Japanese Esoteric Buddhism. (Fresno: Shingon Buddhist International Institute, 1988.)
 Chandra, Lokesh (1965) Sanskrit bījas and mantras in Japan, New Delhi , International Academy of Indian Culture,  BQ5125.B5 A75 1965

External links 

 Fonts:
 Noto Sans Siddham from the Noto fonts project
 Muktamsiddham—Free Unicode Siddham font
 ApDevaSiddham—(Japanese) Free Unicode 8.0 Siddham Font (mirror)
 Siddham alphabet on Omniglot
 Examples of Siddham mantras Chinese language website.
 Visible Mantra an extensive collection of mantras and some sūtras in Siddhaṃ script
 Bonji Siddham Character and Pronunciation
 SiddhamKey Software for inputting Siddham characters

Brahmic scripts